The Royal Anthropological Society of Australasia was established in 1885 as the Anthropological Society of Australasia by the Australian physician Alan Carroll.  The prefix 'Royal' was added in 1901. The society published the journal Science of Man.

According to a 2003 article published by the National Library of Australia, the society is "nowadays seen as forming part of the ‘lunatic fringe’."

References

Organizations established in 1885
Organizations disestablished in 1913
Rongorongo
Organisations based in Australia with royal patronage
Learned societies of Australia
1885 establishments in Australia
1913 disestablishments in Australia